Atal Bihari Vajpayee (25 December 1924 – 16 August 2018) was an Indian politician who served three terms as the 10th Prime Minister of India, first for a term of 13 days in 1996, then for a period of 13 months from 1998 to 1999, followed by a full term from 1999 to 2004. Vajpayee was one of the co-founders and a senior leader of the Bharatiya Janata Party (BJP). He was a member of the Rashtriya Swayamsevak Sangh, a Hindu nationalist volunteer organisation. He was the first Indian prime minister not of the Indian National Congress to serve a full term in office. He was also a renowned poet and a writer.

He was a member of the Indian Parliament for over five decades, having been elected ten times to the Lok Sabha, the lower house, and twice to the Rajya Sabha, the upper house. He served as the Member of Parliament for Lucknow, retiring from active politics in 2009 due to health concerns. He was among the founding members of the Bharatiya Jana Sangh (BJS), of which he was president from 1968 to 1972. The BJS merged with several other parties to form the Janata Party, which won the 1977 general election. In March 1977, Vajpayee became the Minister of External Affairs in the cabinet of Prime Minister Morarji Desai. He resigned in 1979, and the Janata alliance collapsed soon after. Former members of the BJS formed the BJP in 1980, with Vajpayee its first president.

During his tenure as prime minister, India carried out the Pokhran-II nuclear tests in 1998. Vajpayee sought to improve diplomatic relations with Pakistan, travelling to Lahore by bus to meet with Prime Minister Nawaz Sharif. After the 1999 Kargil War with Pakistan, he sought to restore relations through engagement with President Pervez Musharraf, inviting him to India for a summit at Agra.

The administration of Narendra Modi declared in 2014 that Vajpayee's birthday, 25 December, would be marked as Good Governance Day. In 2015, he was conferred India's highest civilian honour, the Bharat Ratna, by the president of India, Pranab Mukherjee. He died in 2018 of age-related illness.

Early life and education 
Vajpayee was born into a Hindu Brahmin family on 25 December 1924 in Gwalior, Madhya Pradesh. His mother was Krishna Devi and his father was Krishna Bihari Vajpayee. His father was a school teacher in their home town. His grandfather, Shyam Lal Vajpayee, had migrated to Morena near Gwalior from his ancestral village of Bateshwar in the Agra district of Uttar Pradesh.

Vajpayee did his schooling at the Saraswati Shishu Mandir in Gwalior. In 1934, he was admitted to the Anglo-Vernacular Middle (AVM) School in Barnagar, Ujjain district, after his father joined as headmaster. He subsequently attended Gwalior's Victoria College, Agra University (now Maharani Laxmi Bai Govt. College of Excellence) where he graduated with a Bachelor of Arts in Hindi, English and Sanskrit. He completed his post-graduation with a Master of Arts in political science from DAV College, Kanpur, Agra University.

Early association with Hindu groups 

His activism started in Gwalior with Arya Kumar Sabha, the youth wing of the Arya Samaj movement, of which he became the general secretary in 1944. He also joined the Rashtriya Swayamsevak Sangh (RSS) in 1939 as a swayamsevak, or volunteer. Influenced by Babasaheb Apte, he attended the Officers Training Camp of the RSS during 1940 to 1944, becoming a pracharak (RSS terminology for a full-time worker) in 1947. He gave up studying law due to the partition riots. He was sent to Uttar Pradesh as a vistarak (a probationary pracharak) and soon began working for the newspapers of Deendayal Upadhyaya: Rashtradharma (a Hindi monthly), Panchjanya (a Hindi weekly), and the dailies Swadesh and Veer Arjun.

By 1942, at the age of 16 years, Vajpayee became an active member of the Rashtriya Swayamsevak Sangh (RSS). Although the RSS had chosen not to participate in the Quit India Movement, in August 1942, Vajpayee and his elder brother Prem were arrested for 24 days during the Quit India Movement. He was released after giving a written statement that while he was a part of the crowd, he did not participate in the militant events in Bateshwar on 27 August 1942. Throughout his life, including after he became prime minister, Vajpayee has labelled the allegation of participation in the Quit India Movement to be a false rumour.

Early political career (1947–1975) 

In 1951, Vajpayee was seconded by the RSS, along with Deendayal Upadhyaya, to work for the newly formed Bharatiya Jana Sangh, a Hindu right-wing political party associated with the RSS. He was appointed as a national secretary of the party in charge of the Northern region, based in Delhi. He soon became a follower and aide of party leader Syama Prasad Mukherjee. In the 1957 Indian general election, Vajpayee contested elections to the Lok Sabha, the lower house of the Indian Parliament. He lost to Raja Mahendra Pratap in Mathura, but was elected from Balrampur. In the Lok Sabha his oratorial skills so impressed Prime Minister Jawaharlal Nehru that he predicted that Vajpayee would someday become the prime minister of India.

Vajpayee's oratorial skills won him the reputation of being the most eloquent defender of the Jana Sangh's policies. After the death of Deendayal Upadhyaya, the leadership of the Jana Sangh passed to Vajpayee. He became the national president of the Jana Sangh in 1968, running the party along with Nanaji Deshmukh, Balraj Madhok, and L. K. Advani.

Janata and the BJP (1975–1995) 

Vajpayee was arrested along with several other opposition leaders during the Internal Emergency imposed by Prime Minister Indira Gandhi in 1975. Initially interned in Bangalore, Vajpayee appealed his imprisonment on the grounds of bad health, and was moved to a hospital in Delhi. In December 1976, Vajpayee ordered the student activists of the ABVP to tender an unconditional apology to Indira Gandhi for perpetrating violence and disorder. The ABVP student leaders refused to obey his order.

Gandhi ended the state of emergency in 1977. A coalition of parties, including the BJS, came together to form the Janata Party, which won the 1977 general elections. Morarji Desai, the chosen leader of the alliance, became the prime minister. Vajpayee served as the minister of external affairs, or foreign minister, in Desai's cabinet. As foreign minister, Vajpayee became the first person in 1977 to deliver a speech to the United Nations General Assembly in Hindi.

In 1979, Desai and Vajpayee resigned, triggering the collapse of the Janata Party. The erstwhile members of the Bharatiya Jana Sangh came together to form the Bharatiya Janata Party (BJP) in 1980, with Vajpayee as its first President.

The 1984 general elections were held in the wake of Prime Minister Indira Gandhi's assassination by her Sikh bodyguards. While he had won the 1977 and the 1980 elections from New Delhi, Vajpayee shifted to his home town Gwalior for the election. 

Vidya Razdan was initially tipped to be the Congress (I) candidate. Instead, Madhavrao Scindia, scion of the Gwalior royal family, was brought in on the last day of filing nominations. Vajpayee lost to Scindia, managing to secure only 29% of the votes.

Under Vajpayee, the BJP moderated the Hindu-nationalist position of the Jana Sangh, emphasising its connection to the Janata Party and expressing support for Gandhian Socialism. The ideological shift did not bring it success: Indira Gandhi's assassination generated sympathy for the Congress, leading to a massive victory at the polls. The BJP won only two seats in parliament. Vajpayee offered to quit as party president following BJP's dismal performance in the election, but stayed in the post until 1986. He was elected to the Rajya Sabha in 1986 from Madhya Pradesh, and was briefly the leader of the BJP in Parliament.

In 1986, L. K. Advani took office as president of the BJP. Under him, the BJP returned to a policy of hardline Hindu nationalism. It became the political voice of the Ram Janmabhoomi Mandir Movement, which sought to build a temple dedicated to the Hindu deity Rama in Ayodhya. The temple would be built at a site believed to be the birthplace of Rama after demolishing a 16th-century mosque, called the Babri Masjid, which then stood there. The strategy paid off for the BJP; it won 86 seats in the Lok Sabha in the 1989 general election, making its support crucial to the government of V. P. Singh. In December 1992, a group of religious volunteers led by members of the BJP, the Rashtriya Swayamsevak Sangh (RSS) and the Vishwa Hindu Parishad (VHP), tore down the mosque.

He served as Member of Parliament, Lok Sabha, for various terms starting at Balrampur from 19571962. He served again from Balrampur from 19671971, then from Gwalior from 19711977, and then from New Delhi from 19771984. Finally, he served from Lucknow from 19912009.

Terms as prime minister (1996–2004)

First term: May 1996 

During a BJP conference in Mumbai in November 1995, BJP President Advani declared that Vajpayee would be the party's prime ministerial candidate in the forthcoming elections. Vajpayee himself was reported to be unhappy with the announcement, responding by saying that the party needed to win the election first. The BJP became the single largest party in Parliament in the 1996 general election, helped by religious polarisation across the country as a result of the demolition of the Babri Masjid. Indian president Shankar Dayal Sharma invited Vajpayee to form the government. Vajpayee was sworn in as the 10th prime minister of India, but the BJP failed to muster a majority among members of the Lok Sabha. Vajpayee resigned after 16 days, when it became clear that he did not have enough support to form a government.

Second term: 1998–1999 

After the fall of the two United Front governments between 1996 and 1998, the Lok Sabha was dissolved and fresh elections were held. The 1998 general elections again put the BJP ahead of others. A number of political parties joined the BJP to form the National Democratic Alliance (NDA), and Vajpayee was sworn in as the prime minister. The coalition was an uneasy one, as apart from the Shiv Sena, none of the other parties espoused the BJP's Hindu-nationalist ideology. Vajpayee has been credited for managing this coalition successfully, while facing ideological pressure from the hardline wing of the party and from the RSS. Vajpayee's government lasted 13 months until mid-1999 when the All India Anna Dravida Munnetra Kazhagam (AIADMK) under J. Jayalalithaa withdrew its support. The government lost the ensuing vote of confidence motion in the Lok Sabha by a single vote on 17 April 1999. As the opposition was unable to come up with the numbers to form the new government, the Lok Sabha was again dissolved and fresh elections were held.

Nuclear tests 

In May 1998, India conducted five underground nuclear tests in the Pokhran desert in Rajasthan, 24 years after its first nuclear test (Smiling Buddha) in 1974. Two weeks later, Pakistan responded with its own nuclear tests making it the newest nation with declared nuclear capability. While some nations, such as France, endorsed India's right to defensive nuclear power, others including the United States, Canada, Japan, Britain and the European Union imposed sanctions on information, resources and technology to India. In spite of intense international criticism and steady decline in foreign investment and trade, the nuclear tests were popular domestically. In effect, the international sanctions imposed failed to sway India from weaponising its nuclear capability. US sanctions against India and Pakistan were eventually lifted after just six months.

Lahore summit 
In late 1998 and early 1999, Vajpayee began a push for a full-scale diplomatic peace process with Pakistan. With the historic inauguration of the Delhi-Lahore bus service in February 1999, Vajpayee initiated a new peace process aimed towards permanently resolving the Kashmir dispute and other conflicts with Pakistan. The resultant Lahore Declaration espoused a commitment to dialogue, expanded trade relations and mutual friendship and envisaged a goal of denuclearised South Asia. This eased the tension created by the 1998 nuclear tests, not only within the two nations but also in South Asia and the rest of the world.

AIADMK's withdrawal from coalition 
The AIADMK had continually threatened to withdraw from the coalition and national leaders repeatedly flew down from Delhi to Chennai to pacify the AIADMK general secretary J. Jayalalithaa. However, in May 1999, the AIADMK did pull the plug on the NDA, and the Vajpayee administration was reduced to a caretaker status pending fresh elections scheduled for October 1999.

Kargil War 

In May 1999 some Kashmiri shepherds discovered the presence of militants and non-uniformed Pakistani soldiers (many with official identifications and Pakistan Army's custom weaponry) in the Kashmir Valley, where they had taken control of border hilltops and unmanned border posts. The incursion was centred around the town of Kargil, but also included the Batalik and Akhnoor sectors and artillery exchanges at the Siachen Glacier.

The Indian army responded with Operation Vijay, which launched on 26 May 1999. This saw the Indian military fighting thousands of militants and soldiers in the midst of heavy artillery shelling and while facing extremely cold weather, snow and treacherous terrain at the high altitude. Over 500 Indian soldiers were killed in the three-month-long Kargil War, and it is estimated around 600–4,000 Pakistani militants and soldiers died as well. India pushed back the Pakistani militants and Northern Light Infantry soldiers. Almost 70% of the territory was recaptured by India. Vajpayee sent a "secret letter" to U.S. President Bill Clinton that if Pakistani infiltrators did not withdraw from the Indian territory, "we will get them out, one way or the other" - meaning he did not rule out crossing the Line of Control (LoC), or was the use of nuclear weapons.

After Pakistan suffered heavy losses, and with both the United States and China refusing to condone the incursion or threaten India to stop its military operations, General Pervez Musharraf was recalcitrant and Nawaz Sharif asked the remaining militants to stop and withdraw to positions along the LoC. The militants were not willing to accept orders from Sharif but the NLI soldiers withdrew. The militants were killed by the Indian army or forced to withdraw in skirmishes which continued even after the announcement of withdrawal by Pakistan.

Third term: 1999–2004

1999–2002 
The 1999 general elections were held in the aftermath of the Kargil operations. The BJP-led NDA won 303 seats out of the 543 seats in the Lok Sabha, securing a comfortable and stable majority. On 13 October 1999, Vajpayee took oath as the prime minister of India for the third time.

A national crisis emerged in December 1999, when Indian Airlines flight IC 814 from Kathmandu to New Delhi was hijacked by five terrorists and flown to Taliban-ruled Afghanistan. The hijackers made several demands including the release of certain terrorists like Masood Azhar from prison. Under pressure, the government ultimately caved in. Jaswant Singh, the minister of external affairs at the time, flew with the terrorists to Afghanistan and exchanged them for the passengers.

In March 2000, Bill Clinton, the President of the United States, paid a state visit to India. This was the first state visit to India by a U.S. president in 22 years, since President Jimmy Carter's visit in 1978. President Clinton's visit was hailed as a significant milestone in relations between the two nations. Vajpayee and Clinton had wide-ranging discussions on bilateral, regional and international developments. The visit led to expansion in trade and economic ties between India and the United States. A vision document on the future course of Indo-U.S. relations was signed during the visit.

Domestically, the BJP-led government was influenced by the RSS, but owing to its dependence on coalition support, it was impossible for the BJP to push items like building the Ram Janmabhoomi temple in Ayodhya, repealing Article 370 which gave a special status to the state of Kashmir, or enacting a uniform civil code applicable to adherents of all religions. On 17 January 2000, there were reports of the RSS and some BJP hard-liners threatening to restart the Jan Sangh, the precursor to the BJP, because of their discontent over Vajpayee's rule. Former president of the Jan Sangh Balraj Madhok had written a letter to the then-RSS chief Rajendra Singh for support. The BJP was, however, accused of "saffronising" the official state education curriculum and apparatus, saffron being the colour of the RSS flag of the RSS, and a symbol of the Hindu nationalism movement. Home Minister L. K. Advani and the Human Resource Development Minister (now called Education Minister) Murli Manohar Joshi were indicted in the 1992 Babri Mosque demolition case for inciting a mob of activists. Vajpayee himself came under public scrutiny owing to his controversial speech one day prior to the mosque demolition.

These years were accompanied by infighting in the administration and confusion regarding the direction of government. Vajpayee's weakening health was also a subject of public interest, and he underwent a major knee-replacement surgery at the Breach Candy Hospital in Mumbai to relieve intense pressure upon his legs.

In March 2001, the Tehelka group released a sting operation video named Operation West End which showed BJP president Bangaru Laxman, senior army officers and NDA members accepting bribes from journalists posing as agents and businessmen. The Defence Minister George Fernandes was forced to resign following the Barak Missile scandal involving the botched supplies of coffins for the soldiers killed in Kargil, and the findings of an inquiry commission that the government could have prevented the Kargil invasion.

Vajpayee initiated talks with Pakistan, and invited Pakistani president Pervez Musharraf to Agra for a joint summit. President Musharraf was believed to be the principal architect of the Kargil War in India. By accepting him as the President of Pakistan, Vajpayee chose to move forward leaving behind the Kargil War. But after three days of much fanfare, which included Musharraf visiting his birthplace in Delhi, the summit failed to achieve a breakthrough as President Musharraf declined to leave aside the issue of Kashmir.

2001 attack on Parliament 

On 13 December 2001, a group of masked, armed men with fake IDs stormed Parliament House in Delhi. The terrorists managed to kill several security guards, but the building was sealed off swiftly and security forces cornered and killed the men who were later proven to be Pakistan nationals. Vajpayee ordered Indian troops to mobilise for war, leading to an estimated 500,000 to 750,000 Indian soldiers positioned along the international border between India and Pakistan. Pakistan responded by mobilising its own troops along the border. A terrorist attack on an army garrison in Kashmir in May 2002 further escalated the situation. As the threat of war between two nuclear capable countries and the consequent possibility of a nuclear exchange loomed large, international diplomatic mediation focused on defusing the situation. In October 2002, both India and Pakistan announced that they would withdraw their troops from the border.

The Vajpayee administration brought in the Prevention of Terrorism Act in 2002. The act was aimed at curbing terrorist threats by strengthening powers of government authorities to investigate and act against suspects. It was passed in a joint session of the parliament, amidst concerns that the law would be misused.

Another political disaster hit his government between December 2001 and March 2002: the VHP held the Government hostage in a major standoff in Ayodhya over the Ram temple. On the 10th anniversary of the destruction of the Babri mosque, the VHP wanted to perform a shila daan, or a ceremony laying the foundation stone of the cherished temple at the disputed site. Thousands of VHP activists amassed and threatened to overrun the site and forcibly perform the ceremony. A grave threat of not only communal violence, but an outright breakdown of law and order owing to the defiance of the government by a religious organisation hung over the nation. The incident, however, ended peacefully with a symbolic handover of a stone at a different location 1 km away from the disputed site.

2002 Gujarat violence 

In February 2002, a train filled with Hindu pilgrims returning to Gujarat from Ayodhya stopped in the town of Godhra. A scuffle broke out between Hindu activists and Muslim residents, and the train was set on fire, leading to the deaths of 59 people. The charred bodies of the victims were displayed in public in the city of Ahmedabad, and the Vishwa Hindu Parishad called for a statewide strike in Gujarat. These decisions stoked anti-Muslim sentiments. Blaming Muslims for the deaths, rampaging Hindu mobs killed thousands of Muslim men and women, destroying Muslim homes and places of worship. The violence raged for more than two months, and more than 1,000 people died. Gujarat was being ruled by a BJP government, with Narendra Modi as the chief minister. The state government was criticised for mishandling the situation. It was accused of doing little to stop the violence, and even being complicit in encouraging it.

Vajpayee reportedly wanted to remove Modi, but was eventually prevailed upon by party members to not act against him. He travelled to Gujarat, visiting Godhra, and Ahmedabad, the site of the most violent riots. He announced financial aid for victims, and urged an end to the violence. While he condemned the violence, he did not chastise Modi directly in public. When asked as to what would be his message to the chief minister in the event of the riots having taking place, Vajpayee responded that Modi must follow raj dharma, Hindi for ethical governance.

At the meeting of the BJP national executive in Goa in April 2002, Vajpayee's speech generated controversy for its contents which included him saying: "Wherever Muslims live, they don't like to live in co-existence with others." The Prime Minister's Office stated that these remarks had been taken out of context. Vajpayee was accused of doing nothing to stop the violence, and later admitted mistakes in handling the events. K. R. Narayanan, then president of India, also blamed Vajpayee's government for failing to quell the violence. After the BJP's defeat in the 2004 general elections, Vajpayee admitted that not removing Modi had been a mistake.

2002–2004 
In late 2002 and 2003 the government pushed through economic reforms. The country's GDP growth exceeded 7% every year from 2003 to 2007, following three years of sub-5% growth. Increasing foreign investment, modernisation of public and industrial infrastructure, the creation of jobs, a rising high-tech and IT industry and urban modernisation and expansion improved the nation's international image. Good crop harvests and strong industrial expansion also helped the economy.

In May 2003, he announced before the parliament that he would make one last effort to achieve peace with Pakistan. The announcement ended a period of 16 months, following the 2001 attack on the Indian parliament, during which India had severed diplomatic ties with Pakistan. Although diplomatic relations did not pick up immediately, visits were exchanged by high-level officials and the military standoff ended. The Pakistani President and Pakistani politicians, civil and religious leaders hailed this initiative as did the leaders of the United States, Europe and much of the world. In July 2003, Prime Minister Vajpayee visited China, and met with various Chinese leaders. He recognised Tibet as a part of China, which was welcomed by the Chinese leadership, and which, in the following year, recognised Sikkim as part of India. China–India relations improved greatly in the following years.

Policies 
Vajpayee's government introduced many domestic economic and infrastructural reforms, including encouraging the private sector and foreign investments, reducing governmental waste, encouraging research and development and privatisation of some government owned corporations. Among Vajpayee's projects were the National Highways Development Project and Pradhan Mantri Gram Sadak Yojana. In 2001, the Vajpayee government launched the Sarva Shiksha Abhiyan campaign, aimed at improving the quality of education in primary and secondary schools.

2004 general election 
In 2003, news reports suggested a tussle within the BJP with regard to sharing of leadership between Vajpayee and Deputy Prime Minister LK Advani. BJP president Venkaiah Naidu had suggested that Advani must lead the party politically at the 2004 general elections, referring to Vajpayee as vikas purush, Hindi for development man, and Advani as loh purush, iron man. When Vajpayee subsequently threatened retirement, Naidu backtracked, announcing that the party would contest the elections under the twin leadership of Vajpayee and Advani.

The NDA was widely expected to retain power after the 2004 general election. It announced elections six months ahead of schedule, hoping to capitalise on economic growth, and Vajpayee's peace initiative with Pakistan. The 13th Lok Sabha was dissolved before the completion of its term. The BJP hoped to capitalise on a perceived 'feel-good factor' and BJP's recent successes in the Assembly elections in Rajasthan, Madhya Pradesh and Chhattisgarh. Under the "India Shining" campaign, it released ads proclaiming the economic growth of the nation under the government.

However, the BJP could only win 138 seats in the 543-seat parliament, with several prominent cabinet ministers being defeated. The NDA coalition won 185 seats. The Indian National Congress, led by Sonia Gandhi, emerged as the single largest party, winning 145 seats in the election. The Congress and its allies, comprising many smaller parties, formed the United Progressive Alliance, accounting for 220 seats in the parliament. Vajpayee resigned as prime minister. The UPA, with the outside support of communist parties, formed the next government with Manmohan Singh as the prime minister.

Post-premiership 

In December 2005, Vajpayee announced his retirement from active politics, declaring that he would not contest in the next general election. In a famous statement at the BJP's silver jubilee rally at Mumbai's Shivaji Park, Vajpayee announced that "Henceforth, Lal Krishna Advani and Pramod Mahajan will be the Ram-Lakshman [the two godly brothers much revered and worshipped by Hindus] of the BJP."

Vajpayee was referred to as the Bhishma Pitamah of Indian politics by former prime minister Manmohan Singh during a speech in the Rajya Sabha, a reference to the character in the Hindu epic Mahabharata who was held in respect by two warring sides.
                            
Vajpayee was hospitalised at All India Institute of Medical Sciences, Delhi (AIIMS) for a chest infection and fever on 6 February 2009. He was put on ventilator support as his condition worsened but he eventually recuperated and was later discharged. Unable to participate in the campaign for the 2009 general election due to his poor health, he wrote a letter urging voters to back the BJP. His protege Lalji Tandon was able to retain the Lucknow seat in that election even though the NDA suffered electoral reverses all over the country. It was speculated that Vajpayee's non-partisan appeal contributed to Lalji's success in Lucknow in contrast to that BJP's poor performance elsewhere in Uttar Pradesh.

Positions held

Personal life 
Vajpayee remained a bachelor for his entire life. He adopted and raised Namita Bhattacharya as his own child, the daughter of longtime friend Rajkumari Kaul and her husband B. N. Kaul. His adopted family lived with him.

Unlike purist Brahmins who shun meat and alcohol, Vajpayee was known to be fond of whisky and meat. He was a noted poet, writing in Hindi. His published works include Kaidi Kaviraj Ki Kundalian, a collection of poems written during the 1975–1977 emergency, and Amar aag hai. With regard to his poetry he wrote, "My poetry is a declaration of war, not an exordium to defeat. It is not the defeated soldier's drumbeat of despair, but the fighting warrior's will to win. It is not the despirited voice of dejection but the stirring shout of victory."

Death 

Vajpayee had a stroke in 2009 which impaired his speech. His health had been a major source of concern; reports said he was reliant on a wheelchair and failed to recognise people. He also had dementia and long-term diabetes. For many years, he had not attended any public engagements and rarely ventured out of the house, except for checkups at the All India Institutes of Medical Sciences.

On 11 June 2018, Vajpayee was admitted to AIIMS in critical condition following a kidney infection. He was officially declared dead there at 5:05 pm IST on 16 August 2018 at the age of 93. Some sources claim that he had died on the previous day. On the morning of 17 August, Vajpayee's body, draped with the Indian flag, was taken to the Bharatiya Janata Party headquarters where party workers paid their tributes until 1 pm. Later that afternoon at 4 pm, Vajpayee was cremated with full state honours at Rashtriya Smriti Sthal near Raj Ghat, and his pyre was lit by his foster daughter Namita Kaul Bhattacharya. Thousands of people and many dignitaries attended his funeral procession, including Prime Minister Narendra Modi and President Ram Nath Kovind. On 19 August, his ashes were immersed in Ganga river at Haridwar by Kaul.

Reactions and tributes  
India reacted to Vajpayee's death with grief and thousands of tributes poured in through social media platforms. Thousands of people paid their respects during his funeral procession. A seven-day state mourning was announced by the central government throughout India. The national flag flew half-mast during this period.
 Afghanistan: Former Afghan President Hamid Karzai was among several foreign dignitaries present at former prime minister Atal Bihari Vajpayee's funeral in New Delhi. He recalled that the departed leader was "the first to offer us civilian planes, Airbuses at the time we were starting out".
 Bangladesh: Bangladesh Prime Minister Sheikh Hasina expressed "deep shock" at the demise of former Indian Prime Minister Atal Bihari Vajpayee and said it is a day of great sadness for the people of Bangladesh. Paying tribute to Vajpayee, Hasina termed him as "one of the most famous sons of India" and a highly respected person in Bangladesh.
 Bhutan: Bhutan king Jigme Khesar Namgyel Wangchuck attended the funeral ceremony in New Delhi.
 China: In a statement, the ministry of foreign affairs said the Indian leader was an "outstanding Indian statesman and had made outstanding contributions to the development of Sino-Indian relations"."China expresses its deep condolences on his death and sincere condolences to the Indian government and people and the relatives of Mr Vajpayee. Premier Li Keqiang has sent a condolence message to the leaders of India," the statement said.
 Israel: Prime Minister of Israel Benjamin Netanyahu conveyed his condolences calling Vajpayee "a true friend of Israel". Foreign Ministry of Israel also extended its condolences on the passing of Vajpayee and in a statement described him as "a genuine friend of Israel".
 Japan: Remembering Vajpayee's visit to Japan in 2001, the Japanese Prime Minister Shinzō Abe said, "On behalf of the Government and people of Japan, I would like to convey my sincerest condolences to the Government and people of India and the bereaved family. His Excellency Vajpayee visited Japan in 2001 as the then-Prime Minister and made significant contributions to the friendship between our two countries as a good friend of Japan. It is him who established the cornerstone of Japan-India relations today". Terming Vajpayee as an eminent leader of India, Abe added, "I pray from the bottom of my heart that his soul may rest in peace".
 Mauritius: On 17 August, the government of Mauritius announced that both Mauritian and Indian flags would fly at half mast in the honour of Vajpayee. During the World Hindi Conference in Mauritius, PM Pravind Jugnauth announced that the cyber tower towards which Vajpayee contributed to be set up in Mauritius would be henceforth named as Atal Bihari Vajpayee tower.
 Pakistan: Pakistan's interim Minister for Law and Information Syed Ali Zafar met External Affairs Minister Sushma Swaraj and extended Pakistan's condolence on the death of former prime minister Atal Bihari Vajpayee. Zafar was among the foreign dignitaries who attended Vajpayee's funeral in New Delhi. Former Pakistani president Pervez Musharraf mourned the demise of former prime minister Atal Bihari Vajpayee, calling him a great man. He said that Vajpayee's demise was a great loss for both India as well as Pakistan.
 Russia: Russian President Vladimir Putin sent a message of condolences to President Ram Nath Kovind and Prime Minister Narendra Modi on the demise of Vajpayee. Putin termed the former prime minister as "outstanding statesman". "Atal Bihari Vajpayee rightly commanded great respect around the world. He will be remembered as a politician who made a major personal contribution to the friendly relations and privileged strategic partnership between our countries. The President of Russia conveyed words of sincere sympathy and support to the family of the deceased, the Government and the people of India", the message read.
 Sri Lanka: Various Sri Lankan leaders paid rich tribute to the three-time PM, hailing him as a "friend of Sri Lanka". In a tweet President Maithripala Sirisena said: "Today, we have lost a great humanist and a true friend of Sri Lanka. Former Prime Minister of India Atal Bihari Vajpayee was a visionary leader and an ardent defender of democracy. My condolences to his family and millions of his admirers around the world". Leader of Opposition R. Sampanthan said that India has lost one of its "most regarded intellectual[s] and [statesmen]". "He served the great country of India with humility and honesty, and he was much loved and respected by millions of people across the world. Former three-time Prime Minister Vajpayee is also an exceptional orator and a leader with a great sense of humour, his speeches within the Indian parliament and outside will always be remembered", he said in a statement, extending his condolences on behalf of the Tamil people of Sri Lanka.
 United States: U.S. Secretary of State Michael Pompeo said Vajpayee recognised early on that the US-India partnership would contribute to the world's economic prosperity and security and the two democracies would continue to benefit from his vision. "On behalf of the people of the United States of America, I extend my heartfelt condolences to the people of India on the recent passing of former prime minister Atal Bihari Vajpayee", Pompeo said in a statement yesterday. He recalled Vajpayee's address to the Congress in 2000, when he had famously characterised US-India ties as a "natural partnership of shared endeavours". "Today, our two countries and our bilateral relationship continue to benefit from Prime Minister Vajpayee vision, which helped promote expanded cooperation", Pompeo said. He said the American people stand with the people of India "as we mourn Prime Minister Vajpayee's passing".

Honours

National honours 
India:
Bharat Ratna (2015)
Padma Vibhushan (1992)

Foreign honours 
Bangladesh:
Recipient of the Bangladesh Liberation War Honour (2016)
Morocco:
Grand Cordon of the Order of Ouissam Alaouite (13 February 1999)

Other achievements 
 In 2012, Vajpayee was ranked number 9 in Outlook magazine's poll of The Greatest Indian.
 In August 2018, Naya Raipur was renamed as Atal Nagar.
 In October 2018, four Himalayan peaks near Gangotri glacier named after his name.

Awards 
 1993, D. Lit. from Kanpur University
 1994, Lokmanya Tilak Award
 1994, Outstanding Parliamentarian Award
 1994, Bharat Ratna Pandit Govind Vallabh Pant Award

Published works 
Vajpayee authored several works of both prose and poetry. Some of his major publications are listed below. In addition to these, various collections were made of his speeches, articles, and slogans.

Prose 
 National Integration (1961)
 New Dimensions of India's Foreign Policy (1979)
 Gathbandhan Ki Rajneeti
 Kucha Lekha, Kucha Bhashana (1996)
 Bindu-Bindu Vicara (1997)
 Decisive Days (1999)
 Sankalp-Kaal (1999)
 Vicara-Bindu (Hindi Edition, 2000)
 India's Perspectives on ASEAN and the Asia-Pacific Region (2003)
 Na Dainyam Na Palayanam
 Nayi Chunouti : Naya Avasar

Poetry 
 Kaidi Kaviraj Ki Kundalian
 Amar Aag Hai (1994)
  (1995) Some of these poems were set to music by Jagjit Singh for his album Samvedna.
 Kya Khoya Kya Paya: Atal Bihari Vajapeyi, Vyaktitva Aur Kavitaem (1999)
 Values, Vision & Verses of Vajpayee: India's Man of Destiny (2001)
 Twenty-One Poems (2003)
 Chuni Hui Kavitayein (2012)

An English translation of a selection of some of Vajpayee's Hindi poetry was published in 2013.

Legacy 

The administration of Narendra Modi declared in 2014 that Vajpayee's birthday, 25 December, would be marked as Good Governance Day.
The world's longest tunnel, Atal Tunnel at Rohtang, Himachal Pradesh, on the Leh-Manali Highway was named after Atal Bihari Vajpayee.
The third longest cable-stayed bridge in India over the Mandovi River, Atal Setu was named in his memory.
The Government of Chhattisgarh changed the name of Naya Raipur to Atal Nagar.

In popular culture 
The Films Division of India has produced the short documentary films Pride of India Atal Bihari Vajpayee (1998) and Know Your Prime Minister Atal Behari Vajpayee (2003), both directed by Girish Vaidya, which explore different facets of his personality. Vajpayee also appears in a cameo in the 1977 Indian Hindi-language film Chala Murari Hero Banne by Asrani.

In 2019, Shiva Sharma and Zeeshan Ahmad, owners of Amaash Films, acquired the official rights of the book The Untold Vajpayee written by Ullekh N P, to make a biopic based on Vajpayee's life from his childhood, college life and finally turning into a politician.

Aap Ki Adalat, an Indian talk show which airs on India TV, featured an interview with Vajpayee just before the 1999 elections. Pradhanmantri, a 2013 Indian documentary television series which aired on ABP News and covers the various policies and political tenures of Indian PMs, includes the tenureship of Vajpayee in the episodes "Atal Bihari Vajpayee's 13 days government and India during 1996–98", "Pokhran-II and Kargil War", and "2002 Gujarat Riots and Fall of Vajpayee Government".

See also 
 List of prime ministers of India
 List of Indian writers

References

Notes

Citations

Sources

Further reading 

 L.K. Advani. My Country My Life. (2008). .
 M.P. Kamal. Bateshwar to Prime Minister House – An Interesting Description of Different Aspects of Atalji's . (2003). .
 G.N.S. Raghavan. New Era in the Indian Polity, A Study of Atal Bihari Vajpayee and the BJP. (1996). .
 P. R Trivedi. Atal Bihari Vajpayee: The man India needs : the most appropriate leader for the twentyfirst century. (2000). .
 Sujata K. Dass. " prem k jain ". (2004). .
 Chandrika Prasad Sharma. Poet politician Atal Bihari Vajpayee: A biography. (1998). .
 Sheila Vazirani. Atal Bihari Vajpayee; profile & personal views (Know thy leaders). (1967). .
 C.P. Thakur. India Under Atal Behari Vajpayee: The BJP Era. (1999). 
 Sita Ram Sharma. Prime Minister Atal Behari Vajpayee: Commitment to power. (1998). .
 Bhagwat S. Goyal Values, Vision & Verses of Vajpayee: India's Man of Destiny 2001 Ghaziabad, Uttar Pradesh. .
 Darshan Singh. Atal Behari Vajpayee: The arch of India. (2001). .
 Yogesh Atal. Mandate for political transition: Re-emergence of Vaypayee. (2000). .
 Sujata K. Das. Atal Bihari Vajpayee. (2004).

External links 

 Profile – Govt. of India
 Profile at BBC News
 

 
1924 births
2018 deaths
Ministers for External Affairs of India
People from Gwalior
People from Kanpur
Politicians from Lucknow
Prime Ministers of India
Presidents of Bharatiya Janata Party
Recipients of the Padma Vibhushan in public affairs
Indian Hindus
India MPs 1957–1962
India MPs 1967–1970
India MPs 1971–1977
India MPs 1977–1979
India MPs 1980–1984
India MPs 1991–1996
India MPs 1996–1997
India MPs 1998–1999
India MPs 1999–2004
India MPs 2004–2009
Commerce and industry ministers
Rajya Sabha members from Madhya Pradesh
Hindi-language writers
Hindi-language poets
Indian editors
Rajya Sabha members from Uttar Pradesh
Lok Sabha members from Uttar Pradesh
Lok Sabha members from Madhya Pradesh
Lok Sabha members from Delhi
21st-century prime ministers of India
Leaders of the Opposition (India)
Indians imprisoned during the Emergency (India)
Indian independence activists from Uttar Pradesh
Prisoners and detainees of British India
Bharatiya Jana Sangh politicians
Bharatiya Janata Party politicians
Rashtriya Swayamsevak Sangh pracharaks
Recipients of the Bharat Ratna
Education Ministers of India
20th-century Indian non-fiction writers
Dr. Bhimrao Ambedkar University alumni
Ministers of Power of India
20th-century prime ministers of India
Prisoners and detainees of Maharashtra